Arthur "Art" Morton Swann (born October 17, 1952)  is an American politician who is a Republican member of the Tennessee Senate, representing the 2nd district since December 1, 2017. Prior to being appointed to the state senate to replace Doug Overbey, Swann served in the Tennessee House of Representatives, representing the 8th District both Blount County and part of Sevier County in East Tennessee.

Swann was one of twenty-four members of the Tennessee Senate Republican Caucus who signed a letter signed in support of President Donald Trump effort to contest the results of the 2020 U.S. Presidential election.  This letter signed by Swann "cites "irregularities" in Michigan, Georgia, Nevada and Pennsylvania" despite international observers from the Organization of American States stating that OAS observers witnessed no instances of fraud or voting irregularities in the 2020 U.S. presidential election.

Swann is a former Director of the Metropolitan Knoxville Airport Authority and was formerly elected as a Blount County Commissioner from 1978-1982.

Biography
Arthur Morton Swann was born on October 17, 1952 to his mother, Sue Morton Swann, and his father Eugene Swann, and has one brother, Joseph Alexander Swann.

Swann graduated from Maryville High School in Maryville, Tennessee and later earned a Bachelor of Science in political science and history from the University of Tennessee at Martin in 1975.

Swann is married to Janet Caldwell Swann, and an Episcopalian. Swann formerly worker as the president/owner of Cherokee Lumber Company and sold real estate as an Affiliate Broker (Tennessee License ID 297722).

References

Living people
1952 births
University of Tennessee at Martin alumni
Republican Party members of the Tennessee House of Representatives
American Episcopalians
21st-century American politicians
Republican Party Tennessee state senators